Marfino is the name of several  rural localities in Russia.

Astrakhan Oblast
As of 2010, one rural locality in Astrakhan Oblast bears this name:
Marfino, Astrakhan Oblast, a selo in Marfinsky Selsoviet of Volodarsky District

Ivanovo Oblast
As of 2010, one rural locality in Ivanovo Oblast bears this name:
Marfino, Ivanovo Oblast, a village in Vichugsky District

Kaluga Oblast
As of 2010, two rural localities in Kaluga Oblast bear this name:
Marfino, Tarussky District, Kaluga Oblast, a village in Tarussky District
Marfino, Zhukovsky District, Kaluga Oblast, a village in Zhukovsky District

Kostroma Oblast
As of 2010, three rural localities in Kostroma Oblast bear this name:
Marfino, Chukhlomsky District, Kostroma Oblast, a village in Petrovskoye Settlement of Chukhlomsky District
Marfino, Krasnoselsky District, Kostroma Oblast, a village in Chapayevskoye Settlement of Krasnoselsky District
Marfino, Parfenyevsky District, Kostroma Oblast, a village in Nikolo-Polomskoye Settlement of Parfenyevsky District

Moscow Oblast
As of 2010, four rural localities in Moscow Oblast bear this name:
Marfino, Klinsky District, Moscow Oblast, a village in Nudolskoye Rural Settlement of Klinsky District
Marfino, Mytishchinsky District, Moscow Oblast, a selo in Fedoskinskoye Rural Settlement of Mytishchinsky District
Marfino, Naro-Fominsky District, Moscow Oblast, a village in Pervomayskoye Rural Settlement of Naro-Fominsky District
Marfino, Odintsovsky District, Moscow Oblast, a village under the administrative jurisdiction of the work settlement of Novoivanovskoye in Odintsovsky District

Nizhny Novgorod Oblast
As of 2010, two rural localities in Nizhny Novgorod Oblast bear this name:
Marfino, Sosnovsky District, Nizhny Novgorod Oblast, a village in Rozhkovsky Selsoviet of Sosnovsky District
Marfino, Voskresensky District, Nizhny Novgorod Oblast, a village in Nakhratovsky Selsoviet of Voskresensky District

Novgorod Oblast
As of 2010, one rural locality in Novgorod Oblast bears this name:
Marfino, Novgorod Oblast, a village in Novoselskoye Settlement of Starorussky District

Penza Oblast
As of 2010, one rural locality in Penza Oblast bears this name:
Marfino, Penza Oblast, a selo in Plessky Selsoviet of Mokshansky District

Pskov Oblast
As of 2010, one rural locality in Pskov Oblast bears this name:
Marfino, Pskov Oblast, a village in Opochetsky District

Ryazan Oblast
As of 2010, one rural locality in Ryazan Oblast bears this name:
Marfino, Ryazan Oblast, a village in Bolsheyekaterinovsky Rural Okrug of Putyatinsky District

Saratov Oblast
As of 2010, one rural locality in Saratov Oblast bears this name:
Marfino, Saratov Oblast, a selo in Atkarsky District

Smolensk Oblast
As of 2010, one rural locality in Smolensk Oblast bears this name:
Marfino, Smolensk Oblast, a village in Veshkovskoye Rural Settlement of Ugransky District

Tver Oblast
As of 2010, one rural locality in Tver Oblast bears this name:
Marfino, Tver Oblast, a village in Kimrsky District

Vologda Oblast
As of 2010, two rural localities in Vologda Oblast bear this name:
Marfino, Ustyuzhensky District, Vologda Oblast, a village in Mezzhensky Selsoviet of Ustyuzhensky District
Marfino, Vologodsky District, Vologda Oblast, a village in Oktyabrsky Selsoviet of Vologodsky District

Yaroslavl Oblast
As of 2010, one rural locality in Yaroslavl Oblast bears this name:
Marfino, Yaroslavl Oblast, a village in Prechistensky Rural Okrug of Pervomaysky District